Feehery is a surname. Notable people with the surname include:

Brandon Feehery (born 1992), American riding cyclist
Gerald Feehery (born 1960), American football player
John Feehery (born 1963), American political communications strategist